Rosaria is the Italian feminine form of Rosario. It may refer to:

Rosaria Capacchione, Italian journalist and politician
Rosaria Console, Italian runner
 Rosaria Conte, Italian social scientist
 Rosaria Piomelli, Italian architect
 Rosaria Salerno, Italian American politician
 Rosaria, a fictional playable character in the game Genshin Impact

See also
 Rosario (given name)

Italian feminine given names